The 1994–95 Divizia A was the seventy-seventh season of Divizia A, the top-level football league of Romania.

Teams

League table

Promotion / relegation play-off

Positions by round

Results

Top goalscorers

Champion squad

References

Liga I seasons
Romania
1994–95 in Romanian football